Maximus III, born Manuel Christonymos, (? – 3 April 1482), was Ecumenical Patriarch of Constantinople from 1476 to his death in 1482, and a scholar. He is honoured as a saint in the Eastern Orthodox Church and his feast day is November 17.

Life
Manuel Christonymos was probably a native of the Peloponnese in Greece.

He became Grand Ecclesiarch (i.e. Head Sacristan) of the Patriarchate of Constantinople. This ministry soon after the Fall of Constantinople to the Ottoman Empire (1453) took the functions also of the skeuophylax, taking care of the holy treasures and relics of the Patriarchate, and in this position Manuel clashed with Patriarch Gennadius Scholarius on economical issues.   Under the patronage of the secretary of the Ottoman Sultan, Demetrios Kyritzes, Manuel, together with the Great Chartophylax George Galesiotes, influenced the life of the Church of Constantinople for more than twenty years.

In 1463 he sided with Patriarch Joasaph I against the request of the politician George Amiroutzes, a Greek nobleman from the former Empire of Trebizond, to marry a second wife because it was a case of bigamy under Christian canon law. As punishment for his support of Joasaph, Manuel had his nose cut by order of Sultan Mehmed II.

In autumn 1465 (or early 1466) Manuel sponsored the election to the Patriarchate of Mark II, and later he opposed the patriarchs supported by other factions, such as Symeon of Trebizond and Dionysius I, who on 15 January 1467 stripped him and George Galesiotes of their posts in the administration of the church.

However they soon regained their influence. Manuel was successful in recovering the esteem of sultan Mehmed II, and in spring 1476 he himself was elected as Patriarch of Constantinople. He was still a lay person, so he first became a monk taking the religious name of Maximus, and the next day he received consecration as a bishop and he was enthroned as Patriarch by the Metropolitan of Heraclea. His reign ended a period of troubles for the Church in the region, and was marked by peace and consensus.

Maximus died on 3 April 1482.

His main literary work is the "Monody on the Capture of Constantinople".

Notes

External links
 Historia politica et patriarchica Constantinopoleos, Cap IX: P. Maximus, (trans. Martin Crusius, 1584) Primary source. 

15th-century patriarchs of Constantinople
1482 deaths
15th-century Byzantine historians
Byzantine saints of the Eastern Orthodox Church
People from the Peloponnese
Year of birth unknown
15th-century Greek writers